Mukhanov is a Russian masculine surname, which originates from Mukhan, a short form of Muhammad, rather than from the Russian word муха (fly). its feminine counterpart is Mukhanova. It may refer to
Alex Mukhanov (born 1976), Ukrainian ice hockey defenceman
Viatcheslav Mukhanov (born 1956), Russian theoretical physicist and cosmologist
Vladimir Mukhanov (born 1954), Russian football coach 

Russian-language surnames